Itilleq (old spelling: Itivdleq) is a settlement in the Qeqqata municipality in central-western Greenland. It is located on a small island around 1 km from the mainland, 45 km south of Sisimiut and 2 km north of the Arctic Circle on the shores of Davis Strait. It had 89 inhabitants in 2020.

History 
Itilleq was founded in 1847 on another island, but was later moved 1 kilometer east to its present location.

Economy 
The main trade in the settlement is fishing and hunting, with a fish factory being the principal employer in the settlement. The island has no freshwater, and for this reason Itilleq makes use of a facility for forming freshwater from seawater. The village is served by the communal all-purpose Pilersuisoq store.

Transport 
There is no road connection to any other settlement, but that is so for most other settlements in Greenland.

Air 
The closest aerodrome is Sisimiut Airport in Sisimiut, with connections to Ilulissat, Kangerlussuaq, Maniitsoq, and Nuuk operated by Air Greenland. There are no regular helicopter services to coastal settlements of Davis Strait in the Qeqqata and Sermersooq municipalities. But Itilleq has a helipad (20m, gravel) referenced also in the AIP (BGIQ), so there is on-demand air service possible.

Sea 
Royal Arctic Line provides weekly ferry services to Sarfannguit and Sisimiut, a port of call for the Arctic Umiaq Line, with connections to Ilulissat and Aasiaat in the Disko Bay region, and to coastal towns in southwestern and southern Greenland.

Population 
The population of Itilleq has been stable in the last two decades.

Notable residents
 Hans Enoksen − the fourth Prime Minister of Greenland (2002-2009)

References

Davis Strait
Populated places in Greenland
Populated places of Arctic Greenland
Populated places established in 1847
Qeqqata
1847 establishments in Greenland